Calosoma inquisitor (the lesser searcher beetle or caterpillar-hunter)   is a species of ground beetle. The species is found in northern Africa, Europe (northward to southern Scandinavia) and East to Asia Minor, Iran and the Caucasus, with isolated populations in eastern Siberia and Japan.

The imagines  are predatory on various insects and their larvae, especially,  feed on Lepidoptera larvae. They can fly well and are found not only on the ground, but also in bushes and on trees. In case of danger the beetle can fall and then threaten by lifting up the front body and spreading the mandibles. The females lay about 50 eggs. The hatching larvae are also predatory and develop very quickly. They're in the ground. The beetles emerge in June, but still linger in a diapause until next spring in the ground.

References

Calosoma inquisitor (Linnaeus, 1758)

External links

inquisitor
Beetles described in 1758
Taxa named by Carl Linnaeus